Song Young-min (born March 11, 1994) is a South Korean football player. He plays for J2 League club Kamatamare Sanuki.

References

External links

1995 births
Living people
South Korean footballers
J2 League players
V-Varen Nagasaki players
Kamatamare Sanuki players
Association football goalkeepers